Direto do Campo de Extermínio It is the sixth studio album Facção Central hip hop group, released in 2003. It contains two CDs.

Track listing

CD 1
"Chico Xavier Do Gueto"	
"Vozes Sem Voz"	
"Aqui Ela Não Pode Voar"	
"São Paulo - Aushwitz Versão Brasileira" (sic!)
"O Menino Do Morro"	
"Hoje Deus Anda De Blindado"
"Alcatraz"
"Quando Eu Sair Daqui"
"Conversando Com Os Mortos"	
"Reflexões Do Corredor Da Morte"	
"CNN Periférica"	
"Eu Não Pedi Pra Nascer"	
"765 Motivos Para Morrer"	
"No Trilho Do Vale Da Sombra"	
"O Homem Estragou Tudo"

CD 2
"O Poder Que Eu Não Quero"	
"Um Grito De Socorro"	
"Um Gole De Veneno"	
"O Que Os Olhos Vêem"	
"Dias Melhores Não Virão"	
"Estrada da Dor - 666"	
"Em Nome Da Honra"	
"Sangue, Suor E Lágrimas"	
"No Fim Não Existem Rosas"	
"Observando O Rio De Sangue"	
"Aperte O Gatilho Por Favor"	
"Vão Ter Que Algemar Meu Cadáver"	
"A Mil Anos Luz Da Paz"	
"A Paz é uma Pomba Branca"

History 
 "The group's album also received an award for best album of the year in 2009 in Hutuz in the city of Rio de Janeiro, Brazil."

2003 albums
Facção Central albums